Xanthoparmelia canobolasensis is a lichen which belongs to the Xanthoparmelia genus. It is found in the Australian states of New South Wales and Tasmania. Although not currently endangered it appears to fulfill the criteria under the Tasmanian Threatened Species Protection Act 1995 .

Description 
Grows to around 5–10 cm in diameter with slightly irregular and long imbricate lobes measuring approximately 1-3mm wide with visible black margins. The upper surface of the lichen is yellow-green surface but becomes gray with age.

Habitat and range 
Xanthoparmelia canobolasensis and Xanthoparmelia metastrigosa are known to be found in the area surrounding Mount Canobolas, with the range or Xanthoparmelia canobolasensis also extending into the dry forests on the island of Tasmania.

See also 

 List of Xanthoparmelia species

References 

canobolasensis
Lichen species
Lichens of Australia
Lichens described in 1981